George Mason IV (1725–1792) was an early American planter and statesman, considered one of the "Founding Fathers" of the United States.

George Mason may also refer to:

People
George Mason I (1629–1686), early American colonist and statesman
George Mason II (1660–1716), early American planter and statesman
George Mason III (1690–1735), early American planter and statesman, father of George Mason IV
George Mason (writer) (1735–1806), English writer and book collector
George Mason V (1753–1796), early American planter and militiaman
George Mason VI (1786–1834), American planter
George Mason (actor), New Zealand actor who appeared in 50 Ways of Saying Fabulous and other films
George Mason (footballer, born 1896) (1896–1987), English footballer who played for Leeds United in the 1920s
George Mason (footballer, born 1913) (1913–1993), English footballer who played for Coventry City in the 1930s and 1940s
George Mason (racing driver) (1890–1918), American racing driver
George Mason (rugby league) (died 1996), Australian rugby league footballer and coach
George B. Mason (1828–1899), Australian dance musician and theatre founder
George Champlin Mason Jr. (1849–1924), American architectural preservationist
George Champlin Mason Sr. (1820–1894), American architect
George D. Mason (1856–1948), American architect in Detroit, Michigan
George Hemming Mason (1818–1872), English landscape artist
George Thomson Mason (1818–1846), U.S. Army Second Lieutenant in the Mexican–American War
George W. Mason (1891–1954), American automobile industry executive
George Mason (bishop) (1729–1783), Anglican clergyman
George Mason (priest) (died 1562), Canon of Windsor

Other uses
George Mason (24 character), fictional character in American television series 24
George Mason, Virginia, census-designated place in Fairfax County, Virginia, USA
George Mason University, public university in Fairfax County, Virginia

See also
George Mason Patriots, NCAA sports teams from George Mason University
George Joseph Gustave Masson (1819–1888), English educationalist

Mason, George